Geschichte vom armen Hassan is an East German film. It was released in 1958.

External links
 

1958 films
1950s children's fantasy films
East German films
1950s German-language films
Films based on Asian myths and legends
German children's fantasy films
Films based on fairy tales
1950s German films